Guido De Martino (born Somma Vesuviana, 22 August 1943) is a former Italian politician of the Italian Socialist Party. He is also the son of the late socialist politician Francesco De Martino and was kidnapped for 40 days in 1977 by the Camorra.

Biography 
De Martino was born in Somma Vesuviana, Naples Italy on 22 August 1943 to the family of Francesco De Martino. He would get a degree in philosophy, before going on to become a professor of history and philosophy.

While serving as secretary of the Italian Socialist Party (PSI) in Naples, De Martino was kidnapped in Naples on 5 April 1977. He had been taken by the Neapolitan Mafia, the Camorra, who held him for six weeks. He was only freed after a one billion lire ransom, that was raised by the party, was paid to the perpetrators. It would later be revealed that some of the funds the party had provided were attained through kidnappings done by the Red Brigades. This scandal has been compared to the Moro kidnapping, by those who suspected similar political beliefs between the victims to have been the cause.

De Martino would go on to achieve electoral victory in Naples as a member of the PSI, securing a seat in the Italian Chamber of Deputies during the IX legislature and again in XI legislature. He continued to work with the PSI, getting elected to the Italian Senate during the XII and XIII legislatures.

See also
List of kidnappings
List of solved missing person cases

References

External links 
Italian Senate Page
Italian Parliament Page

1943 births
1970s missing person cases
Deputies of Legislature IX of Italy
Deputies of Legislature XI of Italy
Formerly missing people
Italian academics
Italian Socialist Party politicians
Living people
Kidnapped Italian people
Kidnapped politicians
Missing person cases in Italy
Politicians from Naples
Senators of Legislature XII of Italy
Senators of Legislature XIII of Italy